Waraqu Urqu (Quechua waraqu cactus, urqu mountain, "cactus mountain", also spelled Waraju Orqo, Waraqo Orqo) is an archaeological site in the Ayacucho Region in Peru. The Chanka site lies in the La Mar Province, in the west of the Anco District, near Sacha Raqay (Sacharajay, Sacharaccay).

Southeast of Sacha Raqay there is a mountain named Wanaku Urqu (Quechua wanaku guanaco, "guanaco mountain", hispanicized Huanaco Orjo).

References 

Archaeological sites in Peru
Archaeological sites in Ayacucho Region